Cesvaine Municipality is a former municipality in Vidzeme, Latvia. The municipality was formed in 2009 by reorganization of Cesvaine town with its countryside territory, the administrative centre being Cesvaine. In 2010 Cesvaine Parish was created from the countryside territory of Cesvaine town. As of 2020, the population was 2,266.

On 1 July 2021, Cesvaine Municipality ceased to exist and its territory was merged into Madona Municipality.

Twin towns — sister cities

Cesvaine was twinned with:

 Coulaines, France
 Dnipropetrovsk Oblast, Ukraine
 Lagardelle-sur-Lèze, France
 Märjamaa, Estonia
 Volkhov, Russia
 Weyhe, Germany

Gallery

See also
Administrative divisions of Latvia

References

External links

 
Former municipalities of Latvia